The 2011–12 Toto Cup Al was the thirtieth season of the third most important football tournament in Israel since its introduction and the first under the current format. It was held in two stages. First, sixteen Premier League teams were divided into four groups. The winners and runners-up, were advanced to the Quarterfinals. Quarterfinals, Semifinals and Finals were held as one-legged matches, with the Final played at HaMoshava Stadium in Petah Tikva.

It began on 30 July 2011 and ended on 24 January 2012. Ironi Kiryat Shmona were the defending champions, who made it their first Toto Cup Al title overall.

On 24 January 2012, Ironi Kiryat Shmona defended the cup after beating Hapoel Tel Aviv in the finals.

Group stage
The draw took place on 6 June 2011.

The matches were played from 30 July to 16 August 2011.

Group A

Group B

Group C

Group D

Elimination rounds

Quarterfinals
The draw took place on 9 October 2011.

The matches were played on 26 October 2011.

Semifinals
The draw took place on 27 October 2011.

The matches were played on 10 January 2012.

Final

See also
 2011–12 Toto Cup Leumit
 2011–12 Israeli Premier League
 2011–12 Israel State Cup

References

External links
 Official website  

Al
Toto Cup Al
Toto Cup Al